Nauset Regional High School is an NEASC accredited high school located in Eastham, Massachusetts, United States and a part of Nauset Public Schools. Nauset is inside the Cape Cod National Seashore, making it the only high school on the East Coast located within a National Park. The open campus is situated about a half-mile from Nauset Light. Nauset's colors are Black and Gold and the school's mascot is the Warrior.

As of the 2011-12 school year the school had an enrollment of 1,032 students and around 80 classroom teachers (on an FTE basis), for a student–teacher ratio of 12.33.

About and history
The school consists of 8 main buildings (A-G, and the newest building, N) surrounding an open courtyard. Nauset recently built a brand new fitness center adjacent to the gymnasium. Students and faculty may use the gym free of charge and alumni can purchase a membership. The school is named after a small Native American tribe that lived in the area before it was settled by colonists. Nauset High school serves students from the communities of Brewster, Orleans, Eastham, Wellfleet, Truro, and Provincetown. Nauset also offers an open enrollment program for students located in the towns of Dennis, Harwich and Chatham. Nauset's mascot is the Warrior and the schools colors are Black and Gold.

In 2010, the Provincetown School Board elected to shut down Provincetown High School, by the end of the 2012-2013 academic school year due to falling enrollment and lack of funds. By 2012 the 9th and 10th grade students at Provincetown were already moved to Nauset Regional.

In 2012 the school began starting classes at a later time.

In 2013 the school had 1,024 students, which was its highest level in the era. By 2020 it was down to 877. There was a decline of births in the area, and a new Cape Cod Regional Technical High School was attracting students away from Nauset Regional.

Athletics
The Nauset School Committee voted to get rid of the Native American logo representing the "Warrior" but will keep the name "Warrior" as the official mascot. The original mascot depicted a Native American man viewed from the side with Black & Gold war paint on his face, and a feather head-dress on his head, very similar to the Washington Redskins Native American logo. The logo for the school is now a block "N" with one half of the "N" painted black, and the other half painted gold.

The 2016 boys' soccer team finished the season ranked ninth in the nation by USA Today on its final Super 25 Expert Rankings.

The 2018 boys’ soccer team finished the season ranked third in the nation and won the MIAA DII State Championship.

Academics
Nauset Regional High School has many educational departments. There are the departments of English, Mathematics, Social Studies (History), Science, World Language, Physical Education/Health, Fine and Applied Arts, Business and Technology, Dramatic Arts, and Special Education.

English
Students need four credits (four years) of English in order to graduate, and one English credit each year in order to progress to the next year. Ninth Graders must pass English 9 in order to progress to Tenth Grade, Tenth Graders must pass English 10 in order to progress to Eleventh Grade, and so on.

In each year, it is up to the student's discretion what level of course they take. The choices are B-Level, A-Level, Honors, and A.P. (for 11th and 12th Graders.) A.P. English 11 is equivalent to A.P. English Language, while, A.P. English 12 is equivalent to A.P. English Literature.

There are also a variety of English electives that students may take should they wish to.

The standard course progression is as follows:

English 9 → English 10 → English 11 → English 12

All classes may be taken at the B-Level, A-Level (i.e. College Prep at other schools), and Honors levels; and English 11 and English 12 may be taken at the A.P. level as well.

Science
Students need four credits (four years) of Science in order to graduate, but if they fail one year, they may simply double up on science the following year. In the science department, the general progression is as follows. Obviously, it has exceptions. Also, people commonly double up (take multiple science classes in the same year) in this department in order to take more courses.

Physics (A/B/Hon.) → Biology (A/B/Hon.) → Chemistry (A/B/Hon.) → A.P. Physics 1 or A.P. Biology or A.P. Chemistry or A.P. Environmental Science

Mathematics
Students need four credits (four years) of Math in order to graduate, but if they fail one year, they may simply double up on Math the following year. In the math department, the general progression is as follows. Obviously, it has exceptions. Also, people commonly double up (take multiple math classes in the same year) in this department in order to take more courses.

Algebra I (A/B) [usually in middle school] → Geometry (A/B/Hon.) [usually the first year] → Algebra II (A/B/Hon.) → Pre-Calculus (A/B/Hon.) → A.P. Calculus AB/BC

Students may also take A.P. Statistics any time after Algebra II.

Social Studies
Students need three credits (three years) of Social Studies, commonly known as History, in order to graduate, but if they fail one year, they may simply double up on History the following year. In the history department, the general progression is as follows. Obviously, it has exceptions. Also, people commonly double up (take multiple history classes in the same year) in this department in order to take more courses. Note that U.S. History is a graduation requirement.

Western Civilization I (A/Hon.) → Western Civilization II (A/Hon.) or A.P. European History → U.S. History (A/B/Hon./A.P.)
or
Civics and Government (A/Hon.) → A.P. Government and Politics → U.S. History (A/B/Hon./A.P.)

Notable alumni
Mike DeVito (born 1984, class of 2002), NFL defensive lineman for the Kansas City Chiefs. He played football as well as threw shot put and discus on the Nauset track and field team. DeVito has also played for the New York Jets.
Nick Minnerath (born 1988), professional basketball player currently playing for the Shanghai Sharks.
Meghan Trainor (born 1993, class of 2012), Grammy winning and multi-platinum singer/songwriter currently signed to Epic Records Recently she was a guest judge on The Voice. 
Julian Cyr (born 1986), Cyr was elected to the Massachusetts State Senate as a Democrat in 2016. He currently represents the Cape and Islands district.

Notable faculty
 Mike Sherman - Former head football coach at Nauset, former NFL head coach for the Green Bay Packers and Texas A&M
 Paul White - Former physical education teacher and coach at Nauset, from 1972 to 2001; helped lead the 1999 boys' golf team to an ACL victory

References

External links
 Nauset Regional High School Building Project
 Index of articles - Provincetown Independent

Schools in Barnstable County, Massachusetts
Public high schools in Massachusetts
Eastham, Massachusetts
1972 establishments in Massachusetts